Llallawa (Aymara for a monstrous potato (like two potatoes) or animal, also spelled Llallagua) is a  mountain in the Bolivian Andes. It is located in the La Paz Department, Aroma Province, Patacamaya Municipality. Llallawa lies northeast of Qullchani (Colchani), west of the Jach'a Jawira.

References 

Mountains of La Paz Department (Bolivia)